The 2000 United States Senate election in Missouri was held on November 7, 2000, to select the next U.S. Senator from Missouri. Incumbent Republican Senator John Ashcroft ran for reelection to a second term, but he was defeated by Democratic Governor Mel Carnahan despite Carnahan's death in a plane crash three weeks before election day. Roger B. Wilson, the newly inaugurated Governor, appointed Mel Carnahan's widow Jean Carnahan to fill the seat. As of 2023, this is the first and only time a deceased person has won a U.S. Senate election.

Background 
In 1998, freshman Senator John Ashcroft briefly considered running for President in 2000. On January 5, 1999, he announced that he would not seek the presidency and would instead seek a second Senate term in the 2000 election. Incumbent two-term Democratic Governor Mel Carnahan ran against Ashcroft.

General election

Candidates
 John Ashcroft, incumbent U.S. Senator (Republican)
 Mel Carnahan, Governor of Missouri (Democratic) (died October 16th)
 Charles Dockins (Natural Law)
 Hugh Foley (Reform)
 Grant Samuel Stauffer (Libertarian)
 Evaline Taylor (Green)

Campaign 
In the general election for the state's seat in the U.S. Senate, Ashcroft was facing then-Governor Mel Carnahan in a highly competitive race, despite the Senator having a larger budget than Carnahan, a war chest that included  significant contributions from corporations such as Monsanto Company, headquartered in St. Louis, Missouri, which gave five times more to Ashcroft's campaign fund than to the fund of any other congressional hopeful at the time.

Carnahan was killed in a plane crash three weeks before the November election date. Nonetheless, Carnahan's name remained on the ballot due to Missouri's election laws. Lieutenant Governor Roger B. Wilson became Governor upon Carnahan's death, to serve the remaining term of Carnahan's governorship. Ashcroft suspended all campaigning on the day of the plane crash in light of the tragedy and resumed it eight days before the election date.

Results
Despite his death, Carnahan won by a margin of approximately fifty thousand votes.  He was the first person ever posthumously elected to the United States Senate. Hence, John Ashcroft became the first ever U.S. Senate candidate, incumbent or otherwise, to be defeated by a dead person. A professor of political science at the University of Missouri commented that the incumbent Senator lost the election because his candidacy was "overwhelmed" by a campaign of "emotion and symbolism."

Aftermath 
Governor Roger B. Wilson appointed Carnahan's 66-year-old widow, Jean Carnahan, to fill the vacant seat until a successor could be duly elected. Ashcroft stated that he hoped the appointment would be "a matter of comfort for Mrs. Carnahan."

Asked by the media whether he would ever seek office again, Ashcroft responded, "The last thing I want to do is think about running for public office again." In December 2000, John Ashcroft was chosen for the position of United States Attorney General by President-elect George W. Bush and his nomination was confirmed by the Senate by a vote of 58 to 42. He served from February 2, 2001 until February 3, 2005.

In 2002, a special election was held in Missouri for the remainder of the six-year term of the state's Senator. Jean Carnahan ran for election to complete the term but was defeated by Republican Jim Talent with a margin of approximately twenty-two thousand votes.

See also 
 2000 United States Senate elections
 2000 United States House of Representatives elections in Missouri
 2000 United States presidential election in Missouri
 2000 Missouri gubernatorial election

Notes

References 

2000
Missouri
2000 Missouri elections